Anton Karlsson (born 20 July 2000) is a speedway rider from Sweden.

Speedway career 
Karlsson came to prominence in 2018, when he won the silver medal at the Swedish Under 21 Championship. He also helped Sweden reach the final of the 2018 Team Speedway Junior World Championship. The following year in 2019 he won a bronze at the Swedish U21 event. Karlsson also competed for Sweden in the finals of the 2018 and 2020 Team Junior European Championship.

In 2022, for the third time he helped Sweden reach the final of the 2022 Team Speedway Junior European Championship, recording a fourth-place finish and also in 2022 he rode for Griparna in the Swedish Allsvenskan.

In 2023, he signed for Västervik in the Swedish Eliserien (the highest league in Sweden).

References 

Living people
2000 births
Swedish speedway riders